Andrey Alexandrovich Travnikov (born February 1, 1971) is a Russian politician. He is the current Governor of Novosibirsk Oblast.

References

External links
 Андрей Травников назначен временно исполняющим обязанности губернатора Новосибирской области. Kremlin.ru.
 Андрей Травников вступил в должность губернатора Новосибирской области. РИА Новости.

Governors of Novosibirsk Oblast
1971 births
Living people
Russian Presidential Academy of National Economy and Public Administration alumni